Homan Bay is an Arctic waterway in Kitikmeot Region, Nunavut, Canada. It is located in western M'Clintock Channel, off the eastern coast of Victoria Island. It is separated from Denmark Bay,  to the west by a peninsula with a narrow isthmus.

References

Bays of Kitikmeot Region
Victoria Island (Canada)